Habern William Freeman (born August 10, 1941) is a Democratic politician from the State of Maryland, having served Harford County in several different elected positions, including Harford County Executive and State Senator.

Education
Freeman graduated in 1962 with a bachelor's degree from Lock Haven State College, now Lock Haven University of Pennsylvania. In 1964, Freeman received his physical therapy certification from the University of Maryland.

Political career
Habern Freeman was elected to the Harford County Council in 1972 and served as its president from 1974 until 1978.  In 1982 Freeman was elected as the third county executive of Harford County and served until 1990, when he was succeeded by Eileen M. Rehrmann.

After serving as County Executive, Habern Freeman was elected in 1990 to State Senator serving District 34, running unopposed.  Freeman served as state senator until 1994.  During his time in the State Senate, he served as a member of the Judicial Proceedings Committee and in 1991 and 1992 served on the Special Joint Committee on Pensions. In 1994, Habern was defeated by David R. Craig, who later also became a County Executive for Harford County.

Election results
1994 Race for Maryland State Senate – District 34

Voters to choose one:
{| class="wikitable"
|-
!Name
!Votes
!Percent
!Outcome
|-
|- 
|David R. Craig, Rep.
|17,444
|  54%
|   Won
|-
|-
|Habern W. Freeman, Dem.
|14,676	
|  46%
|   Lost
|-
|}

1990 Race for Maryland State Senate – District 34

Voters to choose one:
{| class="wikitable"
|-
!Name
!Votes
!Percent
!Outcome
|-
|-
|Habern W. Freeman, Dem.
|19,050	
|  100%
|   Won
|-
|}

References

External links
 http://msa.maryland.gov/msa/mdmanual/36loc/ha/former/html/msa02706.html

1941 births
Living people
Democratic Party Maryland state senators
Lock Haven University of Pennsylvania alumni
People from Harford County, Maryland
People from Bel Air, Maryland
Harford County Executives